Professional basketball clubs in Europe can compete in a number of different competitions, including national leagues, regional (multi-national) leagues, and continental competitions. It is therefore possible for clubs from some countries to take part in several levels of competition in the same season. Clubs usually qualify for European competitions through performance in their national or regional leagues, with the exception of wild cards.

Continental competitions 
There are currently four competitions which are branded as Europe-wide, two controlled by Euroleague Basketball, and two by FIBA Europe. Clubs which compete in these competitions also play in their national and/or regional leagues. Clubs usually qualify for these competitions based on their performance in the national or regional leagues in the previous season.

The EuroLeague is a competition with currently 18 teams. It has historically been the most prestigious competition in European basketball and is widely recognised as the top-tier league in Europe.

The EuroCup is Euroleague Basketball's secondary competition, and currently made up of 20 teams from around Europe. The two finalists of the EuroCup qualify for the next season's EuroLeague.

The Basketball Champions League, which began in 2016, is FIBA Europe's highest competition. Initially, FIBA established EuroLeague in 1958 but never trademarketed the name which was later taken over by Euroleague Basketball. The Basketball Champions League involves 52 teams.

The Europe Cup is FIBA Europe's secondary competition. 47 teams compete, and the teams which did not enter in the Basketball Champions League regular season have the option to drop down into the regular season of the Europe Cup.

Other competitions
Female
EuroLeague Women 
EuroCup Women 
Europe SuperCup Women 
Youth
Next Generation Tournament 
Defunct
 Saporta Cup 
 International Christmas Tournament 
 Korać Cup 
 Ronchetti Cup 
 European Super Cup 
 SuproLeague 
 EuroCup Challenge 
 EuroChallenge

Regional leagues
In addition to national leagues in individual countries, there are leagues which include clubs from several countries.

The ABA League, commonly called the Adriatic League, began in 2001, and consists of clubs from the former Yugoslavia (Bosnia and Herzegovina, Croatia, Montenegro, North Macedonia, Serbia and Slovenia). At different times, the league has also included clubs from Bulgaria, the Czech Republic, Hungary, and Israel. Clubs generally also compete in their own national leagues in the same season, after the conclusion of the ABA League season. The winner of the league qualifies for the next season's EuroLeague.

Balkan International Basketball League began in 2008 and European North Basketball League started in 2021.

The VTB United League is made up of mostly Russian clubs, as well as a smaller number of clubs from nearby countries - currently Belarus and Kazakhstan. It serves as the top division of the Russian national league system. One club from the league qualifies for the next season's EuroLeague, in addition to CSKA Moscow, which holds a EuroLeague license.

Other multi-national leagues in Europe have included the North European Basketball League (1999–2003), the Baltic Basketball League (2004–2018), the Central European Basketball League (2008–2010), and the Latvian-Estonian Basketball League (2018–).

National leagues
Each country generally has its own league system, with various divisions which involve promotion and relegation, as well as playoffs following the regular season. 

The Spanish Liga ACB contributes the most, three to four clubs to the EuroLeague each season. Other leagues among the strongest include Turkey's BSL, Russia's VTB United League, Italy's LBA, the LNB Pro A in France, the Greek Basket League, the Basketball Bundesliga in Germany, and the ABA League.

See also 
 League system
 Spanish basketball league system
 Greek basketball league system
 Italian basketball league system
 French basketball league system
 Russian basketball league system
 Turkish basketball league system
 German basketball league system
 Serbian basketball league system
 Polish basketball league system
 Hungarian basketball league system
 South American professional club basketball system

References

External links 
 EuroLeague official website
 EuroCup official website
 Basketball Champions League official website
 Europe Cup official website

 
Basketball league systems
Professional sports leagues in Europe